The Alliance for Democratic Change (ADC) is a political party in Tanzania.

References

Political parties in Tanzania
Political parties established in 2012
2012 establishments in Tanzania